The 2021–21 season of Ghanaian club Medeama S.C . The season covered the period from 20 November 2020 to 8 August 2021

Overview 
Medeama ended the 2020-21 season without a trophy after placing fifth in the domestic the league and was knock out by Accra Hearts of Oak in the FA Cup

Technical team 
The technical team

Squad 
As of January 2021.

Competitions

Premier League

League table

References 

 
2020–21 Ghana Premier League by team